Peter Karran (born 20 May 1960) is a Manx politician, who is a former leader of the Liberal Vannin Party and former Minister of Education and Children. He was a Member of the House of Keys for Middle, and then for Onchan, from 1985 to 2016.

He was a member of the Manx Labour Party from 1981 but left in 2004. In August 2006 he founded the Liberal Vannin Party and became its first leader.

Career

Karran worked as a joiner. He stood for election in Middle in the 1981 Manx general election but was not elected. In 1985 he contested a by-election in Middle and was elected, becoming the youngest ever elected Member in the House of Keys. In the 1986 general election, Karran contested Onchan and was elected. He repeated his success in Onchan in general elections in 1986, 1991, 1996, 2001, 2006 and 2011. He has been very popular ever since, topping the Onchan polls at most elections. (In 2006 he received more votes than any other candidate for the Keys: partly because Onchan was one of the few three-seat constituencies and so there were more votes available.)

He was a Manx Labour Party member (and one of their two MHKs) but left the party in 2004. In August 2006 he founded the Liberal Vannin Party (LVP) and became its first leader. From 2011 to 2012 Karran served as the Minister of Education and Children under Allan Bell; however he was removed from the position for opposing the position of the Council of Ministers on the film industry.

In February 2014, Karran renounced the leadership of the LVP in favour of Kate Beecroft MHK. Karran said that it "was time for a change".

Around April 2016, Karran announced he would be standing down from the Keys after 31 years in Manx politics.

Controversy

Karran has been highly critical of the Manx Government, for example about the Mount Murray scandal. He was criticised by many people on the island when he announced the closure of all of the island's government-run preschools. His election campaign was based around the protection of frontline services in the Isle of Man, and the school closures were seen as a direct contradiction to that.

Electoral performance
Karran contested several elections, first for the Manx Labour Party and later for the Liberal Vannin Party.

House of Keys elections

Note: Throughout the relevant period the Onchan constituency elected three MHKs and each elector was entitled to three votes. Thus for example achieving 28.1% of the vote might mean that anything up to 84.3% of the electors may have voted for him.

References

Living people
1960 births
British political party founders
Liberal Vannin Party politicians
Members of the House of Keys 1981–1986
Members of the House of Keys 1986–1991
Members of the House of Keys 1991–1996
Members of the House of Keys 1996–2001
Members of the House of Keys 2001–2006
Members of the House of Keys 2006–2011